On 27 January 2003, a bomb placed on a bicycle exploded near the busy Vile Parle railway station in Mumbai, India. The bomb killed one person and injured 28. The blast occurred when Atal Bihari Vajpayee, the Prime Minister of India at the time, was to visit the city.

This was the second in a series of five bombings against the city within a period of eight months. Other bombings included:

 2002 Mumbai bus bombing
 2003 Mumbai train bombing
 2003 Mumbai bus bombing
 25 August 2003 Mumbai bombings

External links
 http://www.rediff.com/news/2003/jan/27mum2.htm

 

Improvised explosive device bombings in India
Terrorist incidents in Mumbai
Terrorist incidents on railway systems in Asia
Railway accidents in 2003
Railway accidents and incidents in Maharashtra
Terrorist incidents in India in 2003
Mumbai Suburban Railway
2000s in Mumbai
January 2003 events in India
2003 murders in India